The Duma of Veliky Novgorod is the city duma of Veliky Novgorod, Russia. A total of 30 deputies are elected for five-year terms.

Elections

2018

References

Veliky Novgorod